Yao Wei (born 1 September 1997) is a Chinese footballer currently playing as a midfielder.

Personal life
Yao is the twin sister of fellow footballer Yao Daogang.

Career statistics

International

International goals

References

1997 births
Living people
Chinese women's footballers
China women's international footballers
Women's association football midfielders
2019 FIFA Women's World Cup players